Caryocaraceae (syn. Rhizobolaceae DC.) is a  small family of flowering plants consisting of two genera with 26 species. The family is native to tropical regions of Central and South America, as well as the West Indies.

References

 
Malpighiales families